Goz or GOZ may refer to:

People 
 Balázs Gőz (born 1992), Hungarian hockey player
 Gottfried Bernhard Göz (1708–1774), German Rococo artist
 Harry Goz (1932–2003), American actor

Other uses 
 Gorna Oryahovitsa Airport, serving Veliko Tarnovo, Bulgaria
 Gozarkhani language
 Grozny Avia, Russian airline
 Obukhov State Plant, a machine-building factory in Russia
 GoZ, a component of ZBrush modelling application